Mike May (born June 22, 1945, in Hobbs, New Mexico) was the Iowa State Representative from the 6th District. He served in the Iowa House of Representatives from 2005 through 2011.  He received his BA from Simpson College and his MS from Minnesota State University, Mankato.

May currently serves on several committees in the Iowa House – the Economic Growth committee; the Transportation committee; and the Education committee, where he is the ranking member.  He also serves on the Education Appropriations Subcommittee.

May was re-elected in 2006 with 8,281 votes, running unopposed.

References

External links
 Representative Mike May official Iowa General Assembly site
 
 Financial information (state office) at the National Institute for Money in State Politics
 Profile at Iowa House Republicans

Republican Party members of the Iowa House of Representatives
1945 births
Living people
People from Hobbs, New Mexico
Simpson College alumni
Minnesota State University, Mankato alumni